Fleur de Lys is a town in the Canadian province of Newfoundland and Labrador. The town had a population of 207 in the Canada 2021 Census. Fleur de Lys is located approximately 26 km north of Baie Verte.

Demographics 

See also
 Baie Verte Peninsula

References

Populated places in Newfoundland and Labrador
Towns in Newfoundland and Labrador